The 2016–17 Azerbaijan First Division  was the 25th season of the second level of football in Azerbaijan. Neftchala FK were the defending champions.

Teams
No team was promoted from the 2015–16 season, whilst Ravan Baku dropped back to the First Division.
Reigning champions Neftchala, along with Baku both didn't participate in this season.

Stadia and locations
''Note: Table lists in alphabetical order.

League table

Results

References

External links
 pfl.az
 AFFA 

Azerbaijan First Division seasons
Azerbaijan First Division
2